The 1912 West Virginia Mountaineers football team was an American football team that represented West Virginia University as an independent during the 1912 college football season. In its first and only season under head coach William P. Edmunds, the team compiled a 6–3 record and outscored opponents by a total of 131 to 106. Carl G. Bachman was the team captain.

Schedule

References

West Virginia
West Virginia Mountaineers football seasons
West Virginia Mountaineers football